Lopholiparis flerxi, the hardhead snailfish, is a species of snailfish from the northern Pacific Ocean where a single specimen (the holotype) was collected in June 2000 from near the Aleutian Islands at a depth of . The length of the fish was  SL.  This species is the only member of its genus.

References

Liparidae
Monotypic fish genera
Fish described in 2004